Yord-e Qasemali (also Romanized as Yord-e Qāsem‘ālī; also known as Yūrd) is a village in Behdasht Rural District, Kushk-e Nar District, Parsian County, Hormozgan Province, Iran. The 2006 census reported its population at 1,468, with 323 families.

References 

Populated places in Parsian County